The 2012 ICF World Junior and U23 Canoe Slalom Championships took place in Wausau, Wisconsin, United States from 11 to 15 July 2012 under the auspices of the International Canoe Federation (ICF). It was the 14th edition of the competition for Juniors (U18) and the inaugural edition for the Under 23 category.

No medals were awarded for the men's junior C2 team event and the women's junior C1 team event due to low number of participating nations.

Medal summary

Men

Canoe

Junior

U23

Kayak

Junior

U23

Women

Canoe

Junior

U23

Kayak

Junior

U23

Medal table

References

External links
International Canoe Federation

ICF World Junior and U23 Canoe Slalom Championships
ICF World Junior and U23 Canoe Slalom Championships